Riley Elizabeth Weston (born August 25, 1966) is an American actress and writer. Weston became embroiled in a debate about ageism in Hollywood after it was discovered that she lied about her age to get work in the entertainment industry.

Early career
Weston graduated from Arlington High School outside of Poughkeepsie. Beginning in 1987, Weston carved out a career as a film and television actor, working steadily throughout her twenties in a series of mostly small bit parts.  Her credits included the sitcoms Growing Pains, Who's the Boss? and 3rd Rock From The Sun, and the film Sister Act 2: Back in the Habit. Through about 1996, she was credited in her appearances as "Kimberlee Kramer".

In May 1997, and by now using the name Riley Weston, she began claiming her date of birth as 1979 in order to be considered for further acting roles.

Screenwriting and age issue
In 1998, she began drafting screenplays and marketing herself to television studios as a recent high school graduate. She was soon hired by the WB Network as a writer for the show Felicity after they saw one of her scripts about teenage sisters. Hailed as a child prodigy and "wunderkind" she was featured on Entertainment Weeklys October 1998 list of the "100 Most Creative People in Entertainment", which described her as an up-and-coming 19-year-old. Shortly thereafter, she was offered a half-million dollar screenwriting deal with Disney.

After Entertainment Tonight began working on a segment about Weston, her real identity and age emerged. Soon afterward, her contract with WB expired and was not renewed, and her deal with Disney fell through. The story sparked much discussion about age bias in entertainment. Weston herself was quoted as asking: "If I were getting a job in any other industry, do you think anyone would care how old I am?"

Recent career
She continues to work as an actress, singer, voiceover artist, and author. Weston's first novel, Before I Go, was published in September 2006. The book earned Weston a 2007 Independent Publisher (IPPY) award for Storyteller of the Year. Her debut novel received the 2007 New York Book Festival Grand Prize and was named Best Fiction.

References

External links 
 Riley Weston Official site
 

1966 births
20th-century American actresses
21st-century American actresses
21st-century American novelists
Actresses from New York (state)
Age controversies
American film actresses
American television actresses
Living people
Writers from Poughkeepsie, New York